Dagens Næringsliv (Norwegian for "Today's Business"), commonly known as DN, is a Norwegian newspaper specializing in business news. , it is the third-largest newspaper in Norway. Editor-in-chief is Janne Johannessen, who was appointed in december 2021, as the first female in this position.

Dagens Næringsliv is owned by media conglomerate Norges Handels og Sjøfartstidende (NHST Media Group), which also owns DN Nye Medier, DN.no Tradewinds, Upstream, DagensIT, Smartcom, Nautisk Forlag, Intrafish, Fiskaren, Europower and Recharge.

The paper has correspondents in New York, Brussels, Stockholm, Phuket, Kristiansand, Stavanger, Bergen, Trondheim and Tromsø. Its main editorial offices are in Oslo.

History and profile
The paper was founded by Magnus Andersen in 1889. Originally named Norges Handels og Sjøfartstidende (Norway's Trade and Seafaring Times), it was renamed Dagens Næringsliv in 1987. The paper has a neoliberal political stance and is headquartered in Oslo. The paper is published in tabloid format.

The circulation of Dagens Næringsliv was 69,000 copies in 2003. It rose to 81,391 copies in 2007. The paper had a circulation of 80,595 copies in 2013, which decreased to 79,639 in 2014 and 74,629 in 2015. In recent years, it has overtaken Dagbladet as the third-most circulated print newspaper in Norway.

Partnership with WikiLeaks
On 5 September 2013, the newspaper said that it is one of 17 "international partners cooperating with Wikileaks about the Spy Files 3 project that spotlights the international surveillance industry. WikiLeaks has released close to 250 documents about 90 surveillance companies".

Newspaper inserts

DN Magasinet
DN Magasinet is found at newsstands on Saturdays (and the last day before the public holidays of Easter and Christmas). It can not be purchased separately; it is an insert of Dagens Næringsliv.

D2
D2 is a lifestyle magazine, which is an insert of Dagens Næringsliv every Friday. The magazine covers a wide range of cultural and lifestyle-related topics, including art, design, fashion, fitness, travel, cars, technology and food. It has won a lot of Norwegian and international prizes for outstanding photography and design. Each issue of D2 is read by 202.000 people.

See also
List of Norwegian newspapers

References

External links
 Official site

1889 establishments in Norway
Business newspapers
Newspapers published in Oslo
Norwegian-language newspapers
Newspapers established in 1889
Daily newspapers published in Norway